John Edward Knight Cutts (1847–1938) FRIBA was a prolific church architect in England.

Background
Cutts was born on 20 March 1847 in Lenton, Nottingham, the son of Edward Lewes Cutts and Mary Ann Elizabeth Knight. Cutts attended the Felsted School, Felsted, 1862 – 1865. He was elected a Fellow of the Royal Institute of British Architects in 1891. With his brother, John Priston Cutts, he designed and supervised the construction of 46 churches in England between 1873 and 1912.

He married Emma Peacock on 29 August 1882 in St Mary's Church, Islington. They had 7 children – the first two died as children and were buried in England.  Five survived and all lived in Canada.

He retired to Canada in 1912. He died on 20 August 1938, near Acton, Ontario, Canada.

Works

Christ Church, North Kensington, London
Herne Hill Mission Competition, London
Wooden reredos, St Matthew's Church, Eastbury Road, Watford, Hertfordshire 
St Bartholomew's Church, Notgrove, Gloucestershire 1872–73 restoration
St Luke's Church, Diamond Street, Camberwell, Southwark, London 1876-77 (destroyed by bombing in the London Blitz)
St Peter's Church, Upper Slaughter, Gloucestershire 1877 restoration
St Peter's Church, Prescott Place, Clapham Manor Street, Lambeth, London 1878 
Wyck Rissington Church, Gloucestershire 1878–79 restoration
St Matthew's Church, Sydenham, London 1879–80 
Cottage Hospital, Bourton on the Water, Gloucestershire 1878–79 
St Leonard's Church, Bledington, Gloucestershire 1878–79 restoration
St Edward's Church, Evenlode, Gloucestershire 1878-79 restoration
St Thomas a Becket Church, Todenham, Gloucestershire 1879 restoration
South Farnborough Church 1880–81 restoration
St Mary's Church, Billericay 1881 repairs
St Mary the Virgin's Church, Baldock, Hertfordshire 1881–82 restoration
St Augustine's Church, Dovercourt 1883–84
St Michael and All Angels Church, Stoke Newington, London
All Saints' Church, Upper Holloway, London 1884–85 
St Andrew's Church, Walsall 1884–87
St Mary's Church, Lansdowne Road, Haringey, London 1886–87 
St Andrew's Church, Longton, Lancashire 1887
St Saviour's Church, Hanley Road, Upper Holloway 1887–88
All Saints’ Church, Tufnell Park, London 1887–88
St Barnabas' Church, Nelson Road, Gillingham Kent 1890
Holy Trinity Church, Rickmansworth Road, Northwood, Hillingdon 1894–95 addition of North aisle 
Oxhey Chapel, Watford, Hertfordshire 1897 Addition of vestries
Marlborough College Mission Buildings 1899–1900 
St Martin's Church, Kensal Rise, 1899
St George's Church, Freezywater, Enfield, Middlesex 1900–1906
St Wulstan's Church, Bournbrook, 1906
St Silas' Church, Nunhead, 1903 (declared redundant and demolished in 2001)
St Philip the Apostle, Tottenham 1906
Christ Church and St John, Manchester Road, Isle of Dogs 1906–07 vestry enlarged
St Luke the Evangelist's Church, New Brompton, Gillingham, Kent 1908
St Paul's Church, St Albans 1909
St Mark's Church, Bush Hill Park, Enfield, Middlesex 1893–1915

References

19th-century English architects
English ecclesiastical architects
Fellows of the Royal Institute of British Architects
People educated at Felsted School
Architects from Nottingham